Michel Bernard (born 14 December 1958, in Bar-le-Duc) is a French writer and senior official. A graduate from the École nationale d'administration (ENA) in 1992, he made a career in the prefectural corps.

Works 
1999: 
2003: 
2003: 
2004: 
2007:  Prix Erckmann-Chatrian 2007
2009:  Prix Maurice Genevoix 2009
2010: , Prix littéraire de l'armée de terre - Erwan Bergot 2010
2011: 
2014: 
2015: , Prix du festival Livres & Musiques de Deauville 2015
2016: 
2016: 
2021: Les Bourgeois de Calais. La Table ronde. ISBN 979-1-0371-0615-5.

Prefaces 
2008: 
2011: 
2013: 
2013: 
2016:

References

External links 

 Michel Bernard on Babelio
 Le nouveau sous-préfet de L’Haÿ-les-Roses est un écrivain multi-primé on Le Parisien (26 February 2016)
 Michel Bernard on France Inter
 Michel Bernard on Le Choix des libraires
 Michel Bernard, Les Forêts de Ravel on Éditions de la Table ronde
 Michel Bernard : un haut-fonctionnaire et écrivain sous-préfet de L’Haÿ-les-Roses on 94 citoyens (28 January 2016)

École nationale d'administration alumni
21st-century French non-fiction writers
1958 births
People from Bar-le-Duc
Living people